Ivan Ashtine (28 September 1924 – 16 November 1985) was a Trinidadian cricketer. He played in two first-class matches for Trinidad and Tobago in 1943/44.

See also
 List of Trinidadian representative cricketers

References

External links
 

1924 births
1985 deaths
Trinidad and Tobago cricketers